State Highway 33 (SH 33) is a New Zealand state highway in the Bay of Plenty in the North Island. It is one of two state highways (along with ) that form a north–south connection between the cities of Tauranga and Rotorua, SH 33 being the most easterly of the two.

Route description
It heads to the north, passing between Lake Rotorua on the west and Lake Rotoiti and Okere Falls on the east. The route then continues north, mostly through hillside, before reaching Paengaroa.

See also
 List of New Zealand state highways

References

External links
 New Zealand Transport Agency

33
Transport in the Bay of Plenty Region